William Rice Warren (December 22, 1885 – November 17, 1969) was an American football player and coach of football and baseball. He served as the head football coach at Randolph–Macon College from 1907 to 1911, the University of Virginia in 1913, 1920 and 1921 and the University of South Carolina in 1916, compiling a college football coaching record of 41–28–5. Warren was also the head baseball coach at Virginia for one season in 1921, tallying a mark of 7–15. In addition he was professor of physical training circa 1920 at the university. Warren later worked as a physician, having obtained his medical degree from the University of Virginia.  He died in 1969 in Orange County, Virginia.

Head coaching record

Football

References

External links
 

1885 births
1969 deaths
American football ends
Randolph–Macon Yellow Jackets athletic directors
Randolph–Macon Yellow Jackets football coaches
South Carolina Gamecocks football coaches
Virginia Cavaliers baseball coaches
Virginia Cavaliers football coaches
Virginia Cavaliers football players
University of Virginia faculty
University of Virginia School of Medicine alumni
People from Harrisonburg, Virginia